Benton Barracks (or Camp Benton) was a Union Army military encampment, established during the American Civil War, in St. Louis, Missouri, at the present site of the St. Louis Fairground Park. Before the Civil War, the site was owned and used by the St. Louis Agricultural and Mechanical Association, which at the time was located on the outskirts of St. Louis. The barracks was used primarily as a training facility for Union soldiers attached to the Western Division of the Union Army.

After the Battle of Lexington, the Post and Convalescent Hospitals were added to the training barracks, in order to assist in treating hundreds of incoming wounded troops. Once the war ended, the barracks was dismantled, returning to its pre-war, civilian use as a fairground and race track. Nothing of the original barracks remains at this site today.

History

In 1861, Major-General John C. Frémont assumed command of the Western Department of War for the Union Army. General Frémont ordered the establishment of a training barracks at the site of the St. Louis Fairgrounds. The barracks originally consisted of five buildings, 740 ft. in length and 40 ft. in width. Additionally, there was a two-story building erected for the headquarters of the Barracks Commander. The barracks could accommodate up to 30,000 soldiers. By 1863, Benton contained over a mile of barracks, as well as warehouses, cavalry stables, parade grounds, and a large military hospital. The hospital was built from the converted amphitheater on the fairground site and could accommodate 2,000 to 3,000 soldiers at a time. During the Civil War, under the administration of Emily Elizabeth Parsons, it was the largest hospital in the West. Parsons recorded many of her experiences at Benton Barracks in her memoir. Another nurse at Benton Barracks, Belle Coddington, wrote about her memories of the hospital in an 1895 reminiscence.

References

Bibliography
Ravenswaay, Charles Van. St. Louis - An Informal History of the City and its People, 1764-1865. Bloomington: University of Illinois Press, 1991.
Scharf, John Thomas. History of Saint Louis City and County. St. Louis: L. H. Everts, 1883.
The United States War Department. The War of the Rebellion: a Compilation of the Official Records of the Union and Confederate Armies. "Correspondence, Orders, etc., from June 13, 1862, to November 30, 1862." Series II: Volume IV. Washington D.C.: 1899.
Winter, William C. Civil War in St. Louis: A Guided Tour. St. Louis: Missouri Historical Society Press, November, 1994.

External links

Benton Barracks, The Civil War Muse

American Civil War hospitals
American Civil War forts
Missouri in the American Civil War
1861 establishments in Missouri